The Bishop of Osnabrück is the ordinary of the Roman Catholic Diocese of Osnabrück, the current incumbent is Franz-Josef Hermann Bode. Theodor Kettmann is his auxiliary bishop.

List of bishops

Early bishops
 Wiho I. ( Wicho I) 783 to 1. April 809
 Meginhard 810 to 12. April 829
 Goswin 829–845
 Gosbert 845 to 11. April 860
 Eckbert 860 to 1. February 887
 Egilmar 887 to 11. May 906
 Bernhard I. 906–918
 Dodo I. 918 to 14. May 949
 Drogo 949 to 7. November 967
 Ludolf 967 to 31. March 978
 Dodo II. 978 to 12. April 996
 Kuno 978–980 (counter-bishop)
 Günther 996 to 27. November 1000
 Wodilulf 998 to 17. February 1003
 Dietmar 1003 to 18. June 1022
 Meginher 1023 to 10. December 1027
 Gozmar 1028 to 10. December 1036
 Alberich 1036 to 19. April 1052
 Benno I. (Werner) 1052–03. December 1067
 Benno II (Bernhard) 1068 to 27 July 1088
 Marquard 1088–1093
 Wicho II. 1093 to 21. April 1101
 Johann I. 1101 to 13. July 1109
 Gottschalk von Diepholz 1109 to 1. January 1119
 Diethard 1119–1137
 Konrad 1119–1125 (counter-bishop)
 Udo von Steinfurt 1137 to 28. June 1141
 Philipp von Katzenelnbogen 1141 to 15. June 1173
 Wezel 1141 (counter-bishop)
 Arnold von Altena 1173–1190
 Gerhard I. von Oldenburg-Wildeshausen 1190–1216
 Adolf von Tecklenburg 1216–1224

Prince-bishops
Prince-Bishops of Osnabrück include:
 1224–1226: Engelbert I von Isenberg
 1206–1227: Otto I
 1227–1239: Konrad I von Velber
 1239–1250: Engelbert I von Isenberg
 1251–1258: Bruno von Isenberg
 1259–1264: Balduin von Rüssel
 1265–1269: Widukind von Waldeck
 1270–1297: Konrad von Rietberg
 1297–1308: Ludwig von Ravensberg
 1309–1320: Engelbert II von Weyhe
 1321–1349: Gottfried von Arnsberg
 1350–1366: Johann II Hoet
 1366–1376: Melchior von Braunschweig-Grubenhagen
 1376–1402: Dietrich of Horne
 1402–1410: Henry I of Schauenburg-Holstein
 1410–1424: Otto von Hoya
 1424–1437: Johann III von Diepholz
 1437–1442: Erich von Hoya
 1442–1450: Heinrich von Moers
 1450–1454: Albert von Hoya
 1454–1455: Rudolf von Diepholz
 1455–1482: Konrad III von Diepholz
 1482–1508: Konrad IV von Rietberg
 1508–1532: Eric of Brunswick-Grubenhagen
 1532–1553: Franz von Waldeck (Lutheran after 1543)
 1553–1574: Johann II von Hoya (Catholic)
 1574–1585: Henry II of Saxe-Lauenburg (Lutheran)
 1585–1591: Bernhard von Waldeck (Lutheran)
 1591–1623: Philip Sigismund of Brunswick-Wolfenbüttel (Lutheran)
 1623–1625: Eitel Frederick von Hohenzollern-Sigmaringen (Catholic)
 1625–1634: Franz Wilhelm von Wartenberg (Catholic)
 1634–1648: Gustav Gustavsson af Vasaborg (Lutheran)
 1648–1661: Franz Wilhelm von Wartenberg (Catholic)
 1662–1698: Ernest Augustus, Elector of Brunswick-Lüneburg (Lutheran)
 1698–1715: Charles Joseph of Lorraine (Catholic)
 1715–1728: Ernest Augustus, Duke of York and Albany (Lutheran)
 1728–1761: Klemens August of Bavaria (Catholic)
 1764–1802: Prince Frederick, Duke of York and Albany (Lutheran), last Prince-Bishop

The prince-bishopric was mediatized in 1803 to the Electorate of Hanover. For Catholic bishops after the mediatization, see Roman Catholic Diocese of Osnabrück.

Modern bishops
Paul Ludolf Melchers  (1857-1866)
Johannes Heinrich Beckmann  (1866-1878)
Johann Bernard Höting  (1882-1898)
Heinrich Hubert Aloysius Voß  (1899-1914)
Hermann Wilhelm Berning  (1914-1955)
Gerhard Franz Demann  (March 3, 1957)
Helmut Hermann Wittler  (1957-1987)
Ludwig Averkamp  (1987-1994)
Franz-Josef Bode  (1995-

External links
Home page

References

Osnabruck
Osnabruck